So-young, also spelled So-yeong, is a Korean feminine given name. Its meaning differs based on the hanja used to write each syllable of the name. There are 45 hanja with the reading "so" and 34 hanja with the reading "young" on the South Korean government's official list of hanja which may be registered for use in given names.

People with this name include:

Actresses and musicians
Ahn So-young (born 1959), South Korean actress
Ko So-young (born 1972), South Korean actress
Soyoung Yoon (born 1984), South Korean violinist
Yoo So-young (born 1986), South Korean singer, former member of After School
Fat Cat (singer) (born Kim So-young, 1990), South Korean singer 
Esom (born Lee So-young, 1990), South Korean actress and model

Sportspeople
Chung So-young (born 1967), South Korean badminton player
Kim So-yeong (born 1992), South Korean badminton player
Lee So-young (volleyball) (born 1994), South Korean volleyball player
Park So-young (born 1994), South Korean badminton player

Visual artists
Soh Yeong Roh (born 1961), South Korean art museum director, daughter of former president Roh Tae-woo
So Yong Kim (born 1968), South Korean-born American filmmaker
Soi Park (born Park So-young, 1971), South Korean photographer
Lee So-young (artist) (born 1973), South Korean manhwa artist

Fictional people
Kang So-young, a female supporting character and antagonist in the 2015 South Korean television series Who Are You: School 2015
Park So-young, a female supporting character in the 2017 South Korean television series Suspicious Partner
Kang So-young, a female supporting character in the 2016 South Korean television series Five Enough

See also
List of Korean given names

References

Korean feminine given names